The Copa Apertura 2000 was the 28th edition of the Chilean Cup tournament. The competition started on February 19, 2000 and concluded on May 11, 2000. Only first level teams took part in the tournament. Universidad de Chile won the competition for their third time, beating Santiago Morning 2–1 in the final.

Calendar

Group Round

Group 1

Group 2

Group 3

Group 4

Semifinals

Third-place match

Final

Top goalscorer
Fernando Martel (Santiago Morning) 7 goals

See also
 2000 Campeonato Nacional

References
RSSSF

Copa Chile
Chile
2000